

Biography

N. Sankaran Nair was an Indian director of Malayalam movies. Since the mid-1950s he had directed around 40 movies.

Filmography

Directed movies
 Nishasurabhikal (2000)
 Agni Nilavu (1991)
 Kanakambarangal (1988)
 Theruvu Narthaki (1988)
 Ee Nootandile Maha Rogam (1987)
 Cabaret Dancer (1986)
 Niramulla Ravulkal (1986)
 Kalki (1984)
 Kudumbam Oru Swargam Bharya Oru Devatha (1984)
 Ponmudy (1982)
 Chandra Bimbam (1980)
 Swattu (1980)
 Chuvanna Chirakukal (1979)
 Lovely (1979)
 Paapathinu Maranamilla (1979)
 Veera Bhadran (1979)
 Mamatha (1979)
 Ee Ganam Marakkumo (1978)
 Madanolsavam (1978)
 Sathrathil Oru Rathri (1978)
 Thamburatti (1978)
 Tharu Oru Janmam Koodi (1978)
 Kavilamma (1977)
 Poojakkedukkatha Pookkal (1977)
 Siva Thandavum (1977)
 Sreedevi (1977)
 Thulavarsham (1976)
 Rasaleela (1975)
 Vishnu Vijayam (1974)
 Madhuvidhu (1970)
 Chattambi Kavala (1969)
 Arakkillam (1967)
 Avar Unarunnu (1956)

Screenplay
 Premaagni (2001)
 Swathu (1980)
 Chuvanna Chirakukal (1979)
 Madanolsavam (1978)
 Sivathaandavam (1977)
 Raasaleela (1975)

Story
 Premaagni (2001)
 Ponmudi (1982)
 Swathu (1980)
 Madanolsavam (1978)
 Sivathaandavam (1977)

Dialogue
 Chuvanna Chirakukal (1979)
 Sivathaandavam (1977)
 Raasaleela (1975)

See also
 List of Malayalam films from 1951 to 1960
 List of Malayalam films from 1961 to 1970
 List of Malayalam films from 1971 to 1975
 List of Malayalam films from 1976 to 1980
 List of Malayalam films from 1981 to 1985
 List of Malayalam films from 1986 to 1990
 List of Malayalam films from 1991 to 1995

References

External links
 
 http://www.malayalachalachithram.com/profiles.php?i=2216

Film directors from Chennai
Malayalam film directors
2005 deaths
1925 births
20th-century Indian film directors
Screenwriters from Chennai
20th-century Indian dramatists and playwrights
Malayalam screenwriters